Arturo Boyacá Gamboa (born 17 April 1957) is a Colombian football manager and former player.

Career
Born in Bogotá, Boyacá played for Independiente Santa Fe as a senior. After retiring, he began his managerial career with Deportes Tolima, before being named in charge of Santa Fe in August 1993.

After managing Deportes Quindío and Venezuelan side Minervén, Boyacá returned to Santa Fe in 1999 to take over the youth categories. On 21 November 2002, he replaced Dragan Miranović at the helm of the first team.

Boyacá was Miranović's assistant in the following years, at Ecuadorian sides Olmedo and Aucas. He returned to managerial duties in 2007, with Categoría Primera B side Academia.

On 18 August 2010, after a period back at Santa Fe as an assistant, Boyacá was named manager of Unión Magdalena. He opted to leave the club in December to join 's staff at Venezuelan side Deportivo Lara, but returned to his home country in the following year to take over Santa Fe. Dismissed on 19 September 2011, he spent more than a year without a club before being appointed in charge of Quindío on 12 June 2013.

Boyacá resigned from Quindío on 24 September 2013, and worked at Boyacá Chicó in 2014. On 25 April 2016, he was appointed La Equidad manager, but was sacked on 1 June of the following year.

On 7 January 2019, Boyacá returned to Santa Fe as manager of the youth categories, but left the club in July. On 10 February 2022, he was named at the helm of Patriotas Boyacá, but left on 18 May.

References

External links

1957 births
Living people
People from Bogotá
Colombian footballers
Independiente Santa Fe footballers
Colombian football managers
Categoría Primera A managers
Deportes Tolima managers
Independiente Santa Fe managers
Deportes Quindío managers
Academia F.C. managers
Unión Magdalena managers
Boyacá Chicó managers
La Equidad managers
Patriotas Boyacá managers
Colombian expatriate football managers
Colombian expatriate sportspeople in Venezuela
Colombian expatriate sportspeople in Ecuador
Expatriate football managers in Venezuela